The  or AC, by its initials in the Spriggan manga series, is a fictional international company with its main headquarters in New York in the United States with numerous facilities worldwide, whose mission is to ensure that certain powerful ancient artifacts are protected and sealed off, so that no nation or group in the world can take advantage of them. It maintains its own para-military force called the ARCAM Private Army and has secret agents known as Spriggans (or Strikers).

It is officially known as the ARCAM Foundation. It was also called the Rockefeller II in the Berseker Arc story.

History
Tea Flatte, who was formerly known as Tea Flatte Arcam, founded the ARCAM Corporation as part of her mission placed on her by Merlin.

In order to hide her true identity to the rest of her ARCAM comrades and friends, she uses the name Tea Flatte as an alias.

Inventions

ARCAM has created the following objects for use by their operatives:

 Armored Muscle Suit

- Created by Professor Mayzel after he recently discovered the Omihalcon metal.

 Yu's Omihalcon combat knife

- Professor Mayzel made it on Yu's request, which included an Omihalcon blade and a knuckle guard

 J-15 pistol rounds

- Its ceramic bullet heads can penetrate hard surfaces, like wood, concrete and metal.

Known ARCAM facilities

North America

United States

 Main Headquarters - High-risk out-of-place artifacts are stored in their underground safes in New York.
 Research Facility - R&D facility for ARCAM. Was invaded by Program YAMA, turning its personnel against Yu and an ARCAM Special Private Army (ASPA) raiding party.

Europe

Turkey

ARCAM Mt. Ararat Research Facility - Created by ARCAM in order to excavate and study Noah's Ark. The facility was half-destroyed during the raids by Machiner's Platoon troopers.

Asia

India

ARCAM New Delhi Hospital - A survivor of an ASPA unit was treated after they were attacked by a COSMOS squad.
ARCAM India Research Facility - A Berserker robot was brought into the building before it was activated and attacked many of the establishment's personnel. The complex has been destroyed after its self-destruct mechanism was used, its status unknown if the research facility has been relocated.

Japan

ARCAM Japan Branch - Yu Ominae and Oboro are stationed here. The branch includes living quarters for Spriggans and ARCAM's guests and working offices. The facility had been attacked twice before. Both were perpetrated by US Armored Corp. and COSMOS forces.
ARCAM Tokyo Hospital - Yu was treated here after receiving critical wounds from a COSMOS raid on ARCAM's Japanese branch.

Pakistan

ARCAM Islamabad Hospital - Yu was briefed here with several ARCAM Special Private Army operatives after recent attacks on their personnel were reported in Pakistan.

Known ARCAM Personnel

Employees 

 Professor Mayzel
 Ms. Margaret
 Steve Foster
 Henry Garnum
 Eva McMahon
 Akiha Ominae
 Percup Ramdi
 Rie Yamabishi
 Yamamoto

ASPA agents 

 Hudler
 Jimmy Max
 Jack
 John
 Pauel
 Paredes
 Ray

Spriggans 

 Yu Ominae
 Jean Jacquemonde
 Tea Flatte (aka Tea Flatte Arcam)
 Oboro

References

Fictional companies
Spriggan